Runaway Jury is a 2003 American legal thriller film directed by Gary Fleder and starring John Cusack, Gene Hackman, Dustin Hoffman, and Rachel Weisz. An adaptation of John Grisham's 1996 novel The Runaway Jury, the film pits lawyer Wendell Rohr (Hoffman) against shady jury consultant Rankin Fitch (Hackman), who uses unlawful means to stack the jury with people sympathetic to the defense. Meanwhile, a high-stakes cat-and-mouse game begins when juror Nicholas Easter (Cusack) and his girlfriend Marlee (Weisz) appear to be able to sway the jury into delivering any verdict they want in a trial against a gun manufacturer. The film was released October 17, 2003.

Plot

In New Orleans, an ex-employee perpetrates a mass shooting with a machine pistol at a stock brokerage firm. Eleven people are killed and several others wounded in the incident. Among the dead is Jacob Wood. Two years later, with attorney Wendell Rohr, Jacob's widow Celeste takes Vicksburg Firearms to court on the grounds that the company's gross negligence led to her husband's death. During jury selection, jury consultant Rankin Fitch and his team communicate background information on each of the jurors through electronic surveillance to defense attorney Durwood Cable, who is in the courtroom.

In the jury pool, Nick Easter attempts to get himself excused from jury duty. Judge Frederick Harkin refuses, claiming he's giving him a lesson in civic duty, and Fitch tells Cable that the judge has now given them no choice but to select Nick as a juror. Nick's congenial manner wins over his fellow jurors, but Frank Herrera, a Marine veteran, takes an instant dislike to him.

A woman named Marlee makes an offer to Fitch and Rohr by phone: she will deliver the desired verdict to the first bidder. Rohr dismisses the offer, assuming it to be a tactic by Fitch to obtain a mistrial. Fitch asks for proof that she can deliver, though, which she provides by asking if he "feels patriotic" and then having the jury pledge allegiance to the flag. By observing the jurors' behaviour through concealed cameras, Fitch identifies Nick as the influencer and orders his apartment to be searched, but finds nothing. 

Marlee retaliates by getting one of Fitch's jurors bounced. Fitch then blackmails three jurors, leading Rikki Coleman, to attempt suicide. He also sends his men to find a concealed storage device in Nick's apartment with key information, after which they set fire to it. Nick shows the judge video footage of Fitch's men breaking into his apartment, and the judge orders the jury sequestered.

Rohr's key witness, a former Vicksburg employee, doesn't show up. After confronting Fitch, Rohr decides that he cannot win the case. He asks his firm's partners for $10 million to pay Marlee. Fitch sends an operative, Janovich, to kidnap Marlee, but she fights him off and raises the price to $15 million. On principle, Rohr changes his mind and refuses to pay. After the CEO of Vicksburg Firearms loses his temper under cross-examination as a witness and makes a bad impression on the jury, Fitch agrees to pay Marlee to be certain of the verdict.

Fitch's subordinate Doyle, who is investigating Nick, finds that Nick is, in fact, Jeff Kerr, a law school drop-out. He then travels to Gardner, Indiana, where Jeff and his law school girlfriend Gabby (i.e., Marlee) both come from. Doyle gently quizzes Gabby's mother, who reveals that Gabby's sister died in a shooting years ago when she was in high school. At the time, the town of Gardner sued the manufacturer of the guns used and lost; Fitch had helped the defense win the case. Doyle concludes that Nick and Marlee's offer is a set-up, and he calls Fitch, but it is too late as the money has already been paid.

After Nick receives confirmation of the payment, he asks the other jurors to review the facts, saying they owe it to Celeste Wood to deliberate. This causes Herrera to launch into a rant against the plaintiff, which undermines any support he had from the other jurors. The gun manufacturer is found liable, with the jury awarding $110 million in general damages to Celeste Wood.

After the trial, Nick and Marlee confront Fitch with a receipt for the $15 million bribe, which they will make public unless he retires. Fitch asks Nick how he got the jury to vote for the plaintiff; Nick replies that he didn't, explaining that he stopped Fitch from stealing the trial merely by getting the jury to vote with their hearts. Nick and Marlee inform an indignant Fitch that the $15 million "fee" will benefit the shooting victims in Gardner.

Cast

Production
In August 1996, Arnon Milchan and distribution partner Warner Bros. paid a record $8 million for the rights to the novel and first-look rights to Grisham's next novel. Directors slated to helm the picture included Joel Schumacher and Mike Newell, with the lead being offered to Edward Norton and Will Smith. The novel's focus on big tobacco was retained until the 1999 film The Insider was released, necessitating a plot change from tobacco to gun companies.

Reception

Box office
The film made $11.8 million in its opening weekend, finishing third. It went on to gross $49.4 million in the United States and a total of $80.2 million worldwide.

Critical response 
On Rotten Tomatoes, the film holds an approval rating of 73% based on 162 reviews, with an average rating of 6.6/10. The site calls the film "an implausible but entertaining legal thriller."  On Metacritic, it has weighted average score of 61 out of 100, based on 38 reviews, indicating "generally favorable reviews". Audiences polled by CinemaScore gave the film an average grade of "A−" on an A+ to F scale.

Roger Ebert gave the film three out of four stars and stated that the plot to sell the jury to the highest-bidding party was the most ingenious device in the story because it avoided pitting the "evil" and the "good" protagonists directly against each other in a stereotypical manner, but it plunged both of them into a moral abyss.

References

External links

 
 
 
 
 
 
 Runaway Jury at The Numbers

2003 films
2000s legal films
2003 thriller drama films
20th Century Fox films
American legal drama films
American thriller drama films
American courtroom films
Films scored by Christopher Young
Films about lawyers
Films based on works by John Grisham
Films directed by Gary Fleder
Films set in New Orleans
Films shot in New Orleans
Juries in fiction
Legal thriller films
Murder–suicide in films
Regency Enterprises films
2003 drama films
Films produced by Arnon Milchan
2000s English-language films
2000s American films